The Zionites were a religious sect flourishing in the eighteenth century at Ronsdorf. (Duchy of Berg, Germany).

History

The sect sprang from a Philadelphian society founded at Elberfeld in 1726 by Elias Eller and the pastor Daniel Schleiermacher. Eller was the foreman of a factory owned by his wife, a rich widow. He had read the writings of ancient and modern visionaries and then formed an apocalyptic, millenarian system of his own. Schleiermacher, grandfather of the celebrated theologian Friedrich Schleiermacher, was also influenced by Eller.

The prophetess of the society was Anna van Bushel, a baker's daughter. Bushel had “dreams and visions, and saw apparitions”. After the death of Eller's wife, Bushel and Eller became a married couple. The newlyweds were known as “the mother and father of Zion" and prophesied that Anna would bear the male saviour of the world. The couple's first child was a daughter, but Eller was able to console the society with Scriptural texts. A son was conceived in 1733, but passed away two years later.

The theology became centralised around Eller, and the “Christian morality” which the Zionites were founded upon was replaced by the craving for coarse and sensual pleasures. In 1737, the sect left Elberfeld and founded Ronsdorf which soon prospered, and through Eller's influence, was raised by the State in 1745 to the rank of a city. Eller then received influential offices and lived in prosperity, reported as a 'tyrannical ruler'.

When Anna passed away unexpectedly in 1744, doubts arose in the mind of Schleiermacher, who was pastor at Ronsdorf. He confessed his mistake and sought to change Eller's mind, but Eller managed to maintain himself until death.

The sect was carried on by the pastors who took Schleiermacher's place by Eller's stepson, Blockhaus, and continued to exist until 1768. The new pastor chosen in this year, and his successors, brought the inhabitants of Ronsdorf back to Protestantism. The after-effects of the movement could be traced into the nineteenth century.

References

Former Christian denominations
Religious organizations established in 1726
1726 establishments in the Holy Roman Empire